DZI , an acronym for State Insurance Institute (Darzhaven zastrahovatelen institut) is a Bulgarian company primarily engaged in various forms of insurance. 

On June 27, 1946, Bulgaria passed a law providing for the nationalisation of insurance companies and for a state monopoly on insurance business. Based on this law, all assets and liabilities of the existing public and cooperative insurance companies, mutual insurance funds, insurance departments of banks etc. are transferred to the State Insurance Institute (DZI). All valid insurances and portfolios, debts, as well as reinsurance contracts preserved their validity and were transferred by rights to DZI. By this act, effectively, DZI merged the active insurance companies into a bigger one. The state insurance control also ended its activity because the functions of the insurance control were transferred to DZI too.

DZI was created by this law as an autonomous company, juridical entity, with headquarters in Sofia and with a complex structure, functioning in this way until 1952 when the establishment of branches and gradual decentralisation of the Institutes activity began.

DZI functioned as the only insurance company in Bulgaria until 1961 when a government decree established the Bulgarian foreign insurance and reinsurance company “Bulstrad,” founded on the then existing department within the DZI. The main shareholder in “Bulstrad” was the Finance Ministry and one of the principal shareholders was DZI itself. “Bulstrad”  dealt with all insurance contracts related to obligations outside of the territory of the country – marine, aviation, tourist etc., while DZI kept its monopoly over insurance business inside the country.

Apart the monopoly on insurance, after 1946 the State gradually raised the relative share of compulsory (by law) insurance. The Law for Property insurance was voted in 1958 and the modifications of 1969 enlarged considerably the range of compulsory property insurance.

The juridical monopoly on insurance has been kept strictly until 1989, when started real competition in insurance. Should be noticed, that although some of the names coincided, the newly created insurance companies were by no means successors of those existing before 1946.

The rise of the new situation in the business was a challenge for DZI, which successfully transformed itself to market conditions and kept its pre-eminent position thanks to excellent performance and the offering of insurance products of the highest standard. Together with its business development, the Company has collaborated actively for the establishment of an appropriate insurance legislation and was among the co-founders of the Bulgarian insurers association in 1992.

In October 1998 DZI was transformed into a public company with 100% state ownership. On 7 December 1999 in the “State Gazette”, issue 107 was published the decision of the Privatisation Agency to open a procedure for privatisation of the “State Insurance Institute – DZI” Plc. which ended with the sale of the company on 27 August 2002 to Emil Kyulev’s “Contract Sofia” Ltd.

On 10 October 2002 at the shareholders’ General Meeting was taken the decision to rename the “State Insurance Institute – DZI” Plc. to “DZI” Plc.

On 21 December 2006, Eurobank EFG acquired over 90% of DZI's banking division, which was merged into Postbank in the third quarter of 2007.

On 3 August 2007 KBC received all needed approval’s documents from regulations authorities and successfully finalised the acquisition of DZI with total amount of the acquired shares reaching 80,457%. 

DZI is headquartered in a six-storey landmark building in the centre of Sofia built 1914-1926 by architect G. Fingov.

References

External links
 Official website of DZI
 DZI Health Insurance

Insurance companies of Bulgaria
Companies based in Sofia
Bulgarian brands